Joseph Edward Cronin (October 12, 1906 – September 7, 1984) was an American professional baseball player, manager and executive. He played in Major League Baseball (MLB) as a shortstop, most notably as a member of the Boston Red Sox. Cronin spent over 48 years in baseball, culminating with 14 years as president of the American League (AL).

During his 20-year playing career (1926–1945), Cronin played for the Pittsburgh Pirates, Washington Senators and the Boston Red Sox; he was a player-manager for 13 seasons (1933–1945), and served as manager for two additional seasons (1946–1947). A seven-time All-Star, Cronin became the first American League player to become an All-Star with two teams; he was elected to the Baseball Hall of Fame in 1956.

Early life

Cronin was born in Excelsior District of San Francisco, California. The 1906 San Francisco earthquake had cost his Irish Catholic parents almost all of their possessions. Cronin attended Sacred Heart High School. He played several sports as a child and he won a city tennis championship for his age group when he was 14. As he was not greatly interested in school, Cronin's grades improved only when the San Francisco Seals of the Pacific Coast League began giving away tickets to students with good conduct and attendance.

Major league career

As a player
Baseball promoter Joe Engel, who scouted for the Senators and managed the Chattanooga Lookouts at Engel Stadium, originally signed Cronin. Engel first spotted Cronin playing in Kansas City. "I knew I was watching a great player", Engel said. "I bought Cronin at a time he was hitting .221. When I told Clark Griffith what I had done, he screamed, 'You paid $7,500 for that bum? Well, you didn't buy him for me. You bought him for yourself. He's not my ballplayer – he's yours. You keep him and don't either you or Cronin show up at the ballpark.'"

In , Cronin had a breakout year, batting .346 with 13 home runs and 126 RBI. Cronin won both the AL Writers' MVP (the forerunner of the BBWAA MVP, established in 1931) and the AL Sporting News MVP. His 1931 season was also outstanding, with him posting a .306 average, 12 home runs, and 126 RBIs. Cronin led the Senators to the 1933 World Series and later married Griffith's niece, Mildred Robertson.

As a player-manager and manager
In his first year, he led the Senators to what would be their last pennant in Washington.

While Cronin was on his honeymoon with Mildred in his hometown of San Francisco, he received a message from Griffith–the Boston Red Sox had offered the Senators their starting shortstop, Lyn Lary, in return for Cronin and $250,000. Red Sox owner Tom Yawkey also offered Cronin a five-year contract as player-manager. Well aware of the Senators' perennial financial problems (Griffith had no income apart from the Senators), Cronin accepted the trade. Cronin remained as player-manager of the Red Sox until , then remained solely as manager until .

Red Sox farm director Billy Evans thought he had found Cronin's successor in Pee Wee Reese, the star shortstop for the Louisville Colonels of the Triple-A American Association. He was so impressed by Reese that he was able to talk Yawkey into buying the Colonels and making them the Red Sox' top farm club. However, when Yawkey and Evans asked Cronin to scout Reese, Cronin realized he was scouting his potential replacement. Believing he still had enough left to be a regular player, Cronin deliberately downplayed Reese's talent and suggested the Red Sox trade him. Reese was eventually traded to the Brooklyn Dodgers, where he went on to a Hall of Fame career. As it turned out, Evans and Yawkey's concerns about Cronin were valid.

Even when World War II saw dozens of young players either enlist or be drafted, Cronin limited his playing appearances to cameo roles as a utility infielder and pinch-hitter.  On June 17, 1943, Cronin sent himself in to pinch hit in both games of a doubleheader and hit a home run each time.

In April 1945, he broke his leg in a game against the Yankees. He sat out the remainder of the season, and retired as a player at the end of the year.

Over his career, Cronin batted .300 or higher eight times, as well as driving in 100 runs or more eight times. He finished with a .301 average, 170 home runs, and 1,424 RBIs.

As a manager, he compiled a 1,236–1,055 record and won two American League pennants (in 1933 and 1946). His 1933 Senators lost the 1933 World Series to the New York Giants, and his 1946 Red Sox–the franchise's first pennant winner in 28 years–lost the 1946 World Series to the St. Louis Cardinals.

As a general manager
At the end of the 1947 season, Cronin succeeded Eddie Collins as general manager of the Red Sox and held the post for over 11 years, through mid-January . In his first off-season, he acquired shortstop Vern Stephens and pitchers Ellis Kinder and Jack Kramer from the St. Louis Browns; all played major roles for the 1948 Red Sox, who finished in a flatfooted tie for the pennant with the Cleveland Indians but lost a one-game tie-breaker. Kinder and Stephens were centerpieces of the Red Sox' 1949–1950 contenders as well. In the former year, they were edged out by the Yankees during the regular season's final weekend; in the latter, they finished third but came within four games of the league-leading Yanks.

As it turned out,  was the last hurrah for the Red Sox during Cronin's tenure as general manager. Cronin's acquisition of future American League Most Valuable Player Jackie Jensen from Washington in  represented a coup, but the club misfired on several "bonus babies" who never lived up to their potential. The Red Sox posted winning season records for all but two of Cronin's 11 seasons as general manager, but from 1951 through 1958 they lagged behind the AL pennant-winners (except for 1954, the Yankees) by an average of almost 18 games. They would not be a factor in a pennant race again until the "Impossible Dream" season of 1967.

Most attention has been focused on Cronin and Yawkey's refusal to integrate the Red Sox roster; by January 1959, when Cronin's tenure as general manager ended, the Red Sox were the only team in the big leagues that had never fielded a black player.  Notably, Cronin once passed on signing a young Willie Mays and never traded for a black player. The Red Sox did not break the baseball color line until six months after Cronin's departure for the AL presidency, when they promoted Pumpsie Green, a utility infielder, from their Triple-A affiliate, the Minneapolis Millers, in July 1959.

As AL president

In January 1959, Cronin was elected president of the American League, the first former player to be so elected and the fourth full-time chief executive in the league's history. When he replaced the retiring Will Harridge, who became board chairman, Cronin moved the league's headquarters from Chicago to Boston. Cronin served as AL president until December 31, 1973, when he was succeeded by Lee MacPhail.

It also endured four franchise shifts: the relocation of the original Senators club (now owned by Cronin's brother-in-law and sister-in-law, Calvin Griffith and Thelma Griffith Haynes) to Minneapolis–Saint Paul, creating the Minnesota Twins (1961); the shift of the Athletics from Kansas City to Oakland; the transfer of the Pilots after only one season in Seattle to Milwaukee as the Brewers; and the transplantation of the expansion Senators after 11 seasons in Washington, D.C., to Dallas–Fort Worth as the Texas Rangers. Of the four expansion teams that joined the league beginning in 1961, three abandoned their original host cities within a dozen years (the Pilots after only one season), and only one team—the Royals—remained in its original municipality. Two of the charter members of the old eight-team league, the Chicago White Sox and Cleveland Indians, also suffered significant attendance woes and were targets of relocation efforts by other cities.

In addition, the AL found itself at a competitive disadvantage compared with the National League during Cronin's term. With strong teams in larger markets and a host of new stadiums, the NL outdrew the AL for 33 consecutive years (1956–1988). In 1973, Cronin's final season as league president, the NL attracted 55 percent of total MLB attendance, 16.62 million vs. 13.38 million total fans, despite the opening of Royals Stadium in Kansas City and the American League's adoption of the designated hitter rule, which was designed to spark scoring and fan interest. While the National League held only an 8–7 edge in World Series play during the Cronin era, it dominated the Major League Baseball All-Star Game, going 15–3–1 in the 19 games played from 1959–1973.

After the  season, Cronin drew headlines when he fired AL umpires Al Salerno and Bill Valentine, ostensibly for poor performance; however, it later surfaced that the two officials were fired for attempting to organize an umpires' union. Neither man was reinstated (Valentine became a successful minor league front-office executive), but the Major League Umpires Association was formed anyway, two years later. However, in 1966, Cronin was hailed for integrating MLB's umpiring staff with the promotion of veteran minor league arbiter Emmett Ashford to the American League.

Hall of Fame
Joe Cronin was inducted into the Baseball Hall of Fame (with Hank Greenberg) in 1956.

Career statistics

Managerial record

Death
In the last months of his life, Cronin struggled with cancer that had invaded his prostate and bones; he suffered a great deal of bone pain as a result. Cronin came to Fenway Park for one of his last public appearances when his jersey number 4 was retired by the Red Sox on May 29, 1984. He died at the age of 77 on September 7, 1984, at his home in Osterville, Massachusetts. He is buried in St. Francis Xavier Cemetery in nearby Centerville.

Legacy
At the number retirement ceremony shortly before Cronin's death, teammate Ted Williams commented on how much he respected Cronin as a father and a man. Cronin was also remembered as a clutch hitter. Manager Connie Mack once commented, "With a man on third and one out, I'd rather have Cronin hitting for me than anybody I've ever seen, and that includes Cobb, Simmons and the rest of them."

In 1999, he was a nominee for the Major League Baseball All-Century Team.

See also

 Boston Red Sox Hall of Fame
 Bay Area Sports Hall of Fame
 List of Major League Baseball career hits leaders
 List of Major League Baseball career doubles leaders
 List of Major League Baseball career triples leaders
 List of Major League Baseball career runs scored leaders
 List of Major League Baseball career runs batted in leaders
 List of Major League Baseball annual doubles leaders
 List of Major League Baseball annual triples leaders
 List of Major League Baseball players to hit for the cycle
 List of Major League Baseball player-managers
 List of Major League Baseball managers by wins

Notes

References
Armour, Mark (2010). Joe Cronin: A Life in Baseball. University of Nebraska Press. .

External links

^Joe Cronin at SABR (Baseball BioProject)

1906 births
1984 deaths
American League All-Stars
American League presidents
American people of Irish descent
Baseball players from San Francisco
Boston Red Sox executives
Boston Red Sox managers
Boston Red Sox players
Deaths from cancer in Massachusetts
Johnstown Johnnies players
Kansas City Blues (baseball) players
Major League Baseball general managers
Major League Baseball player-managers
Major League Baseball players with retired numbers
Major League Baseball shortstops
National Baseball Hall of Fame inductees
New Haven Profs players
People from Osterville, Massachusetts
Pittsburgh Pirates players
Sportspeople from Barnstable County, Massachusetts
Washington Senators (1901–1960) managers
Washington Senators (1901–1960) players